Tell No One is a 2006 French thriller film directed by Guillaume Canet and based on the 2001 novel of the same name by Harlan Coben. Written by Canet and Philippe Lefebvre and starring François Cluzet, the film won four categories at the 2007 César Awards in France: Best Director (Guillaume Canet), Best Actor (François Cluzet), Best Editing and Best Music Written for a Film.

Plot
Dr. Alexandre Beck has been slowly putting his life back together since his wife, Margot, was apparently murdered by a serial killer eight years before. However, Alex finds himself implicated in a double homicideeven though he knows nothing of the crimes. The same day, he receives an email that appears to be from Margot, which includes a link to surveillance footage that shows his wife looking alive and well; the message warns Alex that they are both being watched. As Alex struggles to stay one step ahead of the law, henchmen intimidate his acquaintances into telling them whatever they might know about him, eventually killing a friend named Charlotte. In the meantime, Alex's lesbian sister Anne persuades her well-off partner Hélène to hire a respected attorney, Élisabeth Feldman, to handle his case.

Margot attempts to arrange a meeting with Alex by sending him an email that he must read in an internet café to avoid being spied on. Before this meeting can take place, a warrant is issued for Alex's arrest for Charlotte's murder. Alex goes on the run whilst his friends and lawyers struggle to find out the truth about the murder and Margot's reappearance. As he is being pursued by police, Alex is rescued by Bruno, a gangster from a rough part of the city who feels he owes Alex a favor. The mysterious henchmen reappear to prevent Alex's meeting with his wife, but he is rescued once again by Bruno. Margot is seen almost escaping on a flight to Buenos Aires. Élizabeth proves that Alex has an alibi for Charlotte's murder thanks to eyewitness accounts at the internet café.

Alex notes the numerous mysteries about his wife's deathmysterious photos of her covered in bruises and traces of heroin in her body. He soon discovers that Margot's father Jacques Laurentin faked her death: she had discovered that Philippe Neuville, the young son of a local aristocrat Gilbert Neuville, was a pedophile rapist whose activities were covered up with help from the police; when she confronted him, Philippe beat her, causing the bruises. Jacques explains that he walked in on the beating and shot Philippe. Gilbert  Neuville hired thugs to kill Margot in a phone call. Having tapped the phone call, Jacques doubled the payout for one of the thugs in order to get him to fake her murder instead, kill the other thug and knock out Alex in the process. After shooting the second thug and burying both, Jacques used the body of a dead heroin addict to stand in for Margot's.

Police, listening in on the father's confession, attempt to arrest him, but he shoots himself dead before they can do so. It is revealed that Jacques knew Alex was wearing a wire, and that during a moment in which he had blocked the bug's transmission, had told Alex one last thing: it was in fact Margot who shot Philippe after he beat her; Jacques was covering up her crime, not his. His actions have ensured that she will never be suspected. Philippe's father is arrested, and Alex and Margot reunite at the lake where they fell in love as children.

Cast

 François Cluzet: Alexandre Beck
 Marie-Josée Croze: Margot Beck
 André Dussollier: Jacques Laurentin
 Kristin Scott Thomas: Hélène Perkins
 François Berléand: Eric Levkowitch
 Nathalie Baye: Maître Elisabeth Feldman
 Jean Rochefort: Gilbert Neuville
 Marina Hands: Anne Beck
 Gilles Lellouche: Bruno
 Philippe Lefebvre: Lieutenant Philippe Meynard
 Florence Thomassin: Charlotte Bertaud
 Olivier Marchal: Bernard Valenti
 Guillaume Canet: Philippe Neuville
 Brigitte Catillon: Captain Barthas
 Samir Guesmi: Lieutenant Saraoui
 Jean-Pierre Lorit: Lavelle
 Jalil Lespert: Yaël Gonzales
 Éric Savin: The prosecutor
 Éric Naggar: Pierre Ferrault
 Philippe Canet: François Beck
 Danièle Ajoret: Madame Beck
 Laurent Lafitte: The Basque
 Martine Chevallier: Martine Laurentin
 Thierry Neuvic: Marc Bertaud
 Mika'ela Fisher: Zak
 Anne Marivin: Alex's secretary
 Sara Martins: Bruno's friend
 Françoise Bertin: Antoinette Levkowitch
 Andrée Damant: Simone
 Pierre-Benoist Varoclier: Nurse 1

Production
The script made several alterations to the book; a torture expert changed from an Asian male to a white female, and the identity of the killer was switched. The book's author was quoted in an interview as saying that the film's ending was better than his original ending.

Reception
Tell No One was well received both critically and commercially.

Academy Award-winning British actor Michael Caine said of the film it was the best he had seen in 2007 on the BBC's Film 2007 programme. He also included it among his Top Ten movies of all time in his 2010 autobiography, The Elephant to Hollywood.

Critical response
Rotten Tomatoes gives Tell No One a "Certified Fresh" rating of 94% based on reviews from 104 critics. Metacritic give the film 82/100 based on reviews from 30 critics, indicating "universal acclaim".

Box office
The film generated $17million in ticket sales during its first four weeks at the French box office. In total, the film grossed $22,194,261 in France becoming the 12th highest-grossing film of the year with 3,111,809 tickets sold. Music Box Films acquired the rights to the film and gave it a limited theatrical release on July 2, 2008. The film opened in eight theaters grossing $169,707 during its opening weekend. In total, the film grossed $6,177,192 in North America.

Top ten lists
The film appeared on many critics' top ten lists of the best films of 2008.
 1st: Marc Doyle, Metacritic.com
 2nd: Marjorie Baumgarten, The Austin Chronicle
 7th: Kimberly Jones, The Austin Chronicle
 7th: Marc Mohan, The Oregonian
 7th: Shawn Levy, The Oregonian
 8th: Stephen Holden, The New York Times
 9th: Kenneth Turan, Los Angeles Times
 10th: Ann Hornaday, The Washington Post
 10th: Owen Gleiberman, Entertainment Weekly

References

External links
 
 
 
 
 

2006 films
2006 LGBT-related films
2006 psychological thriller films
French LGBT-related films
French psychological thriller films
2000s French-language films
Films directed by Guillaume Canet
Films based on American novels
Films based on thriller novels
Films whose director won the Best Director César Award
Films featuring a Best Actor César Award-winning performance
Best Film Lumières Award winners
Lesbian-related films
French serial killer films
Films produced by Luc Besson
2000s French films